Monodromia is a genus of flies in the family Empididae.

Species
M. fragilis Collin, 1928

References

Empidoidea genera
Empididae
Diptera of Australasia